Pee Dee is a region of South Carolina.

Pee Dee or Peedee may also refer to:
Pedee people, also spelled Pee Dee and Peedee, a Native American people, now concentrated in South Carolina
Pee Dee, Anson County, North Carolina, United States, a populated place
Pee Dee, Montgomery County, North Carolina, an unincorporated community
Pee Dee River, in North and South Carolina
Peedee Formation, a geologic formation in North and South Carolina
Nickname for the Cleveland Plain Dealer, the major daily newspaper of Cleveland, Ohio, United States
PeeDee the Pirate, mascot of the East Carolina Pirates
Peedee Fryman, a fictional character on Steven Universe

See also 
 PD (disambiguation)